Comparettia newyorkorum is a species of orchid (family Orchidaceae) in the tribe Cymbidieae, native to Bolivia. It is a non-woody epiphyte.

References

newyorkorum
Endemic flora of Bolivia
Plants described in 2008